Jesús Enmanuel Sandrea Briceño or Chuchin (born 29 December 2001) is a Venezuelan footballer who plays as an attacking midfielder.

Career

Club career
Sandrea is a product of Trujillanos and got his professional debut for the club in the Venezuelan Primera División on 12 August 2018 against Mineros de Guayana. He started on the bench, before replacing Enderson Torrealba for the last few minutes.

In June 2021, Sandrea moved to Monagas.

References

External links

Living people
2001 births
Association football midfielders
Venezuelan footballers
Venezuelan Primera División players
Trujillanos FC players
Monagas S.C. players
People from Valera